Victoria Uzoamaka Onejeme was a Nigerian attorney general and the first woman to occupy the position. She was called to the bar in 1965, and assumed the role of attorney general in the old Anambra State in 1976. In 1976, she was sworn in as Commissioner for Justice in Anambra State. She also made history in 1984 when she became the pioneer judge for Federal High Court, Abuja. She is an Igbo from Awka in Anambra State.

References 

Year of birth missing (living people)
Living people
Attorneys General of Nigeria
Nigerian women lawyers
Igbo lawyers
20th-century Nigerian lawyers
20th-century Nigerian women
People from Awka